Dorcadion thessalicum is a species of beetle in the family Cerambycidae. It was described by Pic in 1916. It is known from Bulgaria and Greece.

Subspecies
 Dorcadion thessalicum gioachinoi Pesarini & Sabbadini, 2007
 Dorcadion thessalicum pelionense Breit, 1923
 Dorcadion thessalicum thessalicum Pic, 1916

References

thessalicum
Beetles described in 1916